Koreshkov is a Russian masculine surname, its feminine counterpart is Koreshkova. It may refer to
Alexander Koreshkov (disambiguation)
Andrey Koreshkov (born 1990), Russian mixed martial artist 
Yevgeni Koreshkov (born 1970), Kazakhstani ice hockey player

Russian-language surnames